Tyson Clabo (born October 17, 1981) is a former American football offensive tackle. He was signed by the Denver Broncos as an undrafted free agent in 2004. He played college football at Wake Forest.

Clabo is the nephew of retired NFL punter Neil Clabo He was also a member of the New York Giants, San Diego Chargers, Atlanta Falcons, Miami Dolphins, and Houston Texans.

Early years
Clabo attended Farragut High School in Farragut, Tennessee and lettered in football and basketball. In football, he was a two-time All-Conference selection, and as a senior, he was also named as an All-Region selection, an All-east Tennessee selection, and as an All-State selection.

College career
Clabo played football at Wake Forest. Clabo started all 11 games at left tackle as a sophomore, and he was the only underclassman to start every contest that year. Clabo started all 13 games as a junior and moved to left guard after playing tackle in 2001, helping the Deacon ground game lead the ACC in rushing for the second-straight year. He started the final 36 games of his college career and a total of 37 contests of 47 games played at Wake Forest. Clabo earned first-team All-Atlantic Conference honors as a senior. In 2018 he was inducted into the Wake Forest Sports Hall of Fame.

Professional career

Denver Broncos
Clabo originally signed with Denver Broncos as an undrafted rookie free agent and was waived by the Broncos during the 2004-05 offseason.

New York Giants
He then signed with the New York Giants as a practice squad member.

San Diego Chargers
He then signed with the San Diego Chargers as a practice squad member.

Atlanta Falcons
Clabo eventually was signed to the Falcons practice squad in September 2005 and re-signed by the Falcons team in January 2006.

He was a 2010 Pro Bowl selection.

On July 29, 2011, Clabo signed a five-year contract with the Atlanta Falcons.

In 2012, Clabo started every regular season game at right tackle for the fifth consecutive year including the two playoff games against Seattle and San Francisco. At the end of the season, Clabo received two all-pro votes for his play.

On April 4, 2013, Clabo was released by the Falcons. Clabo ended his career with the Falcons after 7 years and 101 starts, currently putting him 58th in franchise history. Between 2008 and 2012, Clabo started every single game and anchored an offensive line for 4 playoff teams. In July 2020, Clabo was named to the Atlanta Falcons all-decade team alongside longtime left tackle Jake Matthews.

Miami Dolphins
On May 5, 2013, Clabo signed with the Miami Dolphins.

Houston Texans
On July 23, 2014, Clabo signed with the Houston Texans.

References

External links
Atlanta Falcons bio
ESPN player's card

1981 births
Living people
American football offensive guards
American football offensive tackles
Atlanta Falcons players
Denver Broncos players
Farragut High School alumni
Hamburg Sea Devils players
Houston Texans players
Miami Dolphins players
New York Giants players
San Diego Chargers players
Wake Forest Demon Deacons football players
Players of American football from Knoxville, Tennessee
People from Farragut, Tennessee